Solar salt may refer to:
 Sea salt, a salt produced by the evaporation of seawater
 Solar salt, a eutectic molten salt mixture which is used for thermal energy storage